Forrestdale is a suburb of Perth, Western Australia, located within the City of Armadale. It is named after John Forrest, the first premier of Western Australia.

Geography 
Forrestdale is home to Forrestdale Lake, a nature reserve important for waterbirds, many of which breed there.  It usually fills in winter and dries out in summer.  The nature reserve contains the only known remaining habitat of Neopasiphae simplicior, a critically endangered native bee.
Tiger snakes are commonly seen at this nature reserve, along with dugites.

Amenities and facilities 
Forrestdale has a golf course. There is a recently built private school, a campus of Carey Baptist College, which also has another campus in Harrisdale, offering education from kindergarten and daycare to Year 9. The campus hopes to expand to educate students into Year 12 in 2024.

References

External links

Suburbs of Perth, Western Australia
Suburbs in the City of Armadale